Dinsmoor Glacier is a glacier in the Nordenskjöld Coast of Antarctica, named for inventor Charles Dinsmoor. It flows east from the Detroit Plateau, and merges with the Edgeworth Glacier near Mount Elliott before draining into Mundraga Bay.

See also
 List of glaciers in the Antarctic
 Glaciology

References

Further reading 
 Stewart, John,  Antarctica: An Encyclopedia, McFarland, 1990, 

Glaciers of Nordenskjöld Coast